Pachydactylus oshaughnessyi is a species of lizard in the family Gekkonidae. The species is endemic to southern Africa.

Etymology
The specific name, oshaughnessyi, is in honor of Arthur O'Shaughnessy, who was a British herpetologist and poet.

Geographic range
P. oshaughnessyi is found in South Africa and Zimbabwe.

Habitat
The preferred habitat of P. oshaughnessyi is mesic savanna.

Description

Reproduction
P. oshaughnessyi is oviparous.

References

Further reading
Boulenger GA (1885). Catalogue of the Lizards in the British Museum (Natural History). Second Edition. Volume I. Geckonidæ ... London: Trustees of the British Museum (Natural history). (Taylor and Francis, printers). xii + 436 pp. + Plates I-XXXII. (Pachydactylus oshaughnessyi, new species, pp. 204-205 + Plate XVI, figure 3).
Rösler H (2000). "Kommentierte Liste der rezent, subrezent und fossil bekannten Geckotaxa (Reptilia: Gekkonomorpha)". Gekkota 2: 28–153. (Pachydactylus oshaughnessyi, p. 99). (in German).

Pachydactylus
Geckos of Africa
Reptiles of South Africa
Reptiles of Zimbabwe
Reptiles described in 1885
Taxa named by George Albert Boulenger